Hoodwink, Hoodwinked, or Hoodwinkers may refer to:

Books
The Hoodwinkers, 13th book in the Romney Marsh series of novels by Monica Edwards, published in 1962

Comics
 Hoodwink (comics), fictional character in the Marvel Comics universe

Film
 Hoodwink (1981 film), 1981 Australian film
 Hoodwinked!, 2005 American action-comedy film
 Hoodwinked (soundtrack), from the film
 Hoodwinked Too! Hood vs. Evil, 2011 sequel to the 2005/'06 film

Places
 Hoodwink Island, adjacent to Antarctica

See also
 Hood (disambiguation)
 Wink (disambiguation)